Hobyo District is a district in the north-central Mudug region of Somalia. Its capital is the coastal city of Hobyo.

Hobyo is the largest district in Mudug.

References

External links
 Districts of Somalia
 Administrative map of Hobyo District

Districts of Somalia

Mudug